Viktor Nikolayevich Ivanov (21 December 1930 – 14 August 2003) was a Russian rower who competed for the Soviet Union in the 1956 Summer Olympics. In 1956 he and his partner Igor Buldakov won the silver medal in the coxless pair event.

References 

 

1930 births
2003 deaths
Russian male rowers
Soviet male rowers
Rowers at the 1956 Summer Olympics
Olympic rowers of the Soviet Union
Medalists at the 1956 Summer Olympics
Olympic medalists in rowing
Olympic silver medalists for the Soviet Union
European Rowing Championships medalists